Michela Cerruti (born 18 February 1987) is an Italian racing driver, currently competing in the TCR International Series, with Mulsanne Racing.

Career
Born in Rome, Cerruti attended the Università Cattolica del Sacro Cuore in Milan, studying Psychology. Cerruti's racing career began after her father Aldo 'Baronio' Cerruti, also a racing driver, decided to enrol her in a safe driving course with Mario Ferraris, son of Romeo Ferraris, a race-car tuner and constructor. Impressed by Michela's 'speed and instinctive car control', Ferraris convinced Cerruti's father to let her race.

She debuted in the Italian Touring Endurance Championship (CITE) in 2008, racing an Alfa Romeo 147, sharing the drive with Mario Ferraris, finishing third in the class standings. She remained in CITE in 2009, racing an Abarth 500.

For 2010 she stepped up to the Superstars Series, racing a Mercedes C63 AMG for the Romeo Ferraris team. She also competed in the Italian GT Championship for the team in a Ferrari F430.

Remaining in the Superstars Series for a second season in 2011, Cerruti impressed at the opening weekend of the season at Monza, topping the two free practice sessions. She then went on to finish the first race in second position, before winning the second race and taking the championship lead.

In 2014, it was announced that Cerruti would drive for Trulli GP in the inaugural season of Formula E. After four races, she was replaced by Vitantonio Liuzzi; Cerruti had failed to record a points finish during the season, with a best finish of 12th.

Racing record

Complete International Superstars Series results
(key)

Complete FIA Formula 3 European Championship results
(key)

Complete Auto GP results
(key)

Complete Formula E results
(key)

Complete TCR International Series results
(key) (Races in bold indicate pole position; races in italics indicate fastest lap)

† Driver did not finish the race, but was classified as she completed over 90% of the race distance.

References

External links

1987 births
Living people
Racing drivers from Rome
Italian racing drivers
Italian female racing drivers
Toyota Racing Series drivers
Euroformula Open Championship drivers
Superstars Series drivers
German Formula Three Championship drivers
FIA Formula 3 European Championship drivers
Blancpain Endurance Series drivers
Eurocup Mégane Trophy drivers
Auto GP drivers
24 Hours of Spa drivers
Formula E drivers
TCR International Series drivers
Super Nova Racing drivers
NASCAR drivers
RP Motorsport drivers
EuroInternational drivers
Nürburgring 24 Hours drivers